Mike Harris Jr. (born 1985) is a Canadian politician, who was elected to the Legislative Assembly of Ontario in the 2018 provincial election. He represents the riding of Kitchener—Conestoga as a member of the Progressive Conservative Party of Ontario. He is the son of former Ontario premier Mike Harris but is not related to Michael Harris, his immediate predecessor as MPP for Kitchener—Conestoga.

Electoral record

References

Politicians from Kitchener, Ontario
Progressive Conservative Party of Ontario MPPs
21st-century Canadian politicians
Living people
1985 births